Shabili (also Romanized as Shabīlī) is a village in Buzi Rural District, in the Central District of Shadegan County, Khuzestan Province, Iran. At the 2006 census, its population was 161, in 26 families.

References 

Populated places in Shadegan County